Archibald Bruce may refer to:
 Archibald Bruce (writer), Scottish theological writer
 Archibald Bruce (mineralogist), American physician and mineralogist